Mackin Table is an ice-topped, wedge-shaped plateau, about  long, standing just north of Patuxent Ice Stream in the Patuxent Range of the Pensacola Mountains, Antarctica. It was mapped by the United States Geological Survey from surveys and U.S. Navy air photos, 1956–66, and was named for J. Hoover Mackin, professor of geology at the University of Washington, at Seattle. The name was suggested by United States Antarctic Research Program geologists who investigated the Pensacola Mountains, several having been students under Mackin.

References

Plateaus of Antarctica
Landforms of Queen Elizabeth Land